John Hemphill may refer to:

John A. Hemphill (born 1927), United States Army general
John Hemphill (actor) (born 1953), Canadian comic actor, writer, and producer
John Hemphill (senator) (1803–1862), American politician and judge
John J. Hemphill (1849–1912), American politician